Conasprella baccata is a species of sea snail, a marine gastropod mollusk in the family Conidae, the cone snails and their allies.

Like all species within the genus Conasprella, these snails are predatory and venomous. They are capable of "stinging" humans, therefore live ones should be handled carefully or not at all.

Description
The normal length of this marine species is between 15 and 25 mm. The body whorl is conical in shape. The spire is low, concave in profil. Sutural ramps are flat in cross section. The protoconch is relatively swollen and brown colored.

Distribution
Pacific Panama. Type locality not stated but designaterd as off Isla Parida, Golfo de Chiriqui, Panama.

References

  Petit, R. E. (2009). George Brettingham Sowerby, I, II & III: their conchological publications and molluscan taxa. Zootaxa. 2189: 1–218
  Puillandre N., Duda T.F., Meyer C., Olivera B.M. & Bouchet P. (2015). One, four or 100 genera? A new classification of the cone snails. Journal of Molluscan Studies. 81: 1–23

External links
 The Conus Biodiversity website
 Cone Shells – Knights of the Sea
 

baccata
Gastropods described in 1877